Aleksey Cheglakov (born 13 March 1974) is a retired amateur Russian and Uzbekistani Greco-Roman wrestler, who competed in the men's heavyweight category. Throughout his sporting career, Cheglakov has claimed two gold medals each in the same division at the 2001 Asian Wrestling Championships in Ulaanbaatar, Mongolia, and at the 2002 Asian Games in Busan, South Korea, and later represented his nation Uzbekistan at the 2004 Summer Olympics. Cheglakov also trained for the Trade Union Sports Club in Tashkent, Uzbekistan, under head coach Kamil Fatkulin.

Cheglakov set a sporting headline at the 2002 Asian Games in Busan, South Korea, where he prevailed over host nation's Park Myung-Suk to take home the gold medal in the men's heavyweight category.

At the 2004 Summer Olympics in Athens, Cheglakov qualified as a 30-year-old for the men's 96 kg class by receiving a berth and a bronze medal from the Asian Championships in Almaty, Kazakhstan. He scored a total of six technical points to beat Latvia's Igors Kostins, but ended his Olympic campaign with a dramatic defeat against Turkey's Mehmet Özal, who later continued his quest to take home the bronze medal, finishing second only in the preliminary pool, and fourteenth in the final rankings.

References

External links
 

1974 births
Living people
Olympic wrestlers of Uzbekistan
Wrestlers at the 2004 Summer Olympics
Wrestlers at the 2002 Asian Games
Asian Games medalists in wrestling
Sportspeople from Tashkent
Uzbekistani male sport wrestlers
Asian Games gold medalists for Uzbekistan
Medalists at the 2002 Asian Games